Yu 1 or Yu-1 may refer to:

, an Imperial Japanese Army transport submarine in service from 1943 to 1945
Yu-1 torpedo, a Chinese-built torpedo